Poka may refer to:

 The portmanteau word which refers collectively to the universities of POSTECH and KAIST, two of South Korea's most prestigious universities focused on science and technology
 a blunder
 a collective term for Greek poker variations
 Poka-Yoke, a mistake-proof system
 Poka, Burkina Faso, a town in Burkina Faso
 Poka, Saare County, village in Leisi Parish, Saare County, Estonia
 Poka, Tartu County, village in Mäksa Parish, Tartu County, Estonia
 Póka, the Hungarian name for Păingeni village, Glodeni Commune, Mureș County, Romania